Robert Michael Ridley (born 30 May 1942) is an English former professional footballer who played as a winger. After playing for Portsmouth and Gillingham between 1960 and 1967 he moved to South Africa. Ridley coached the Cleveland Cobras of the American Soccer League in 1980.

References

1942 births
Living people
Sportspeople from Reading, Berkshire
English footballers
Footballers from Berkshire
Association football wingers
North American Soccer League (1968–1984) players
American Soccer League (1933–1983) coaches
Gillingham F.C. players
Portsmouth F.C. players
Denver Dynamos players
Dallas Tornado players
English expatriate footballers
English expatriate football managers
English expatriate sportspeople in the United States
Expatriate soccer players in the United States
Expatriate soccer managers in the United States